See:
 Polygyny in India
 Polyandry in India